Brusse v Jahani BV (2013) C-488/11 is an EU law and consumer protection case, concerning the Unfair Terms in Consumer Contracts Directive. It emphasises the foundations of consumer protection on inequality of bargaining power and imbalances in information.

Facts
Mr Asbeek Brusse had a residential tenancy with Jahani BV, a corporation whose business was being a landlord. The tenancy agreement had a penalty clause requiring the tenant pay €25 per day for not fulfilling any obligation under the agreement. When Brusse stopped paying the rent, Jahani BV claimed €5,462 in unpaid rent and €8,325 in penalties.

Judgment

Dutch Courts
The Dutch district court upheld Jahani BV's claims. The Regional Court of Appeal referred the question to the ECJ, asking (1) did the tenancy fall in the Directive's scope, (2) was the national court itself obliged to determine if the contract term was unfair and annul the term under art 6, (3) could it mitigate the penalty or disapply the clause as a whole.

European Court of Justice
The ECJ held that the Unfair Terms in Consumer Contracts Directive was based on consumers being in a weaker position, both regarding bargaining power and knowledge. Consumers might have no chance to influence terms drawn up in advance. The inequality for the consumer was aggravated where the contract related to an essential need, namely lodging. However, under article 1(2) contractual terms subject to mandatory statutory provisions of national law were not subject to the Directive, as in the RWE case. The national court would determine whether this was true. Imbalances that consumers face can only be corrected by positive action unconnected to the parties to the contract. The national court had to itself assess whether a contract term is unfair, referring to Banco Espanol v Camino and Banif Plus v Csipai. If a national court can, it must assess the validity of a measure in light of national public policy rules. A contract, under art 6(1) which has unfair terms continues in existence, apart from the unfair terms. It followed that a national court cannot reduce a penalty amount instead of excluding the clause entirely in its operation against the consumer.

The Court's judgment included the following.

See also

EU law
English contract law

Notes

References

External links
Text of judgment on Bailii

Court of Justice of the European Union case law
2013 in case law